Nabi Salih (alternatively Nabi Saleh) is a small Palestinian village in the Ramallah and al-Bireh Governorate in the central West Bank, located 20 kilometers northwest of Ramallah. It has a population (2016) of 600. It is noted for the weekly marches to protest the occupation undertaken since 2010, a practice suspended in 2016, after 350 villagers were estimated to have suffered injuries in clashes with Israeli troops over that period.

History
Sherds from the Roman and Byzantine era have been found here.

Ottoman era
Nabi Salih, like all of Palestine, was incorporated into the Ottoman Empire in 1517, and sherds from the early Ottoman era have also been found here. In the 1596 tax record, the village appeared (with the name Dayr Salih) as being in the nahiya of Quds in the liwa of Quds. It had a population of  2 households, both  Muslim. They paid a fixed  tax-rate of 33.3% on agricultural products, including wheat, barley and summer crops, in addition to occasional revenues; a total of 550 akçe.

The  French explorer Victor Guérin visited the place twice in the 19th century. In 1863 he scaled the nearby height, and in 1870 he noted that the place was named after a person who "is venerated there under a koubbeh partially constructed with regular stonework with an appearance of antiquity." In 1870 Guérin estimated that the village had 150 inhabitants, while  an Ottoman village list from about the same year showed that "Nebi Salih" had 5 houses and a population of 22, though the population count included men only.

In 1882, the PEF's Survey of Western Palestine described Neby Saleh as: "a village of moderate size on a ridge, with a small mosque and a well to the south. A spring exists about three-quarters of a mile east."

In 1896 the population of Nabi Salih was estimated to be about 102 persons.

British Mandate
In the 1922 census of Palestine, conducted by the British Mandate of Palestine, there were 105 people living in Nabi Salih, all Muslims, rising to 144 in the 1931 census.

In the 1945 statistics, the population was 170, all Muslims, while the total land area was 2,846 dunams, according to an official land and population survey. Of this, 862 were  plantations and irrigable land, 669 for cereals, while 11 dunams were classified as built-up (urban) areas.

Jordanian era
In the wake of the 1948 Arab–Israeli War, and after the 1949 Armistice Agreements, Nabi Salih came under Jordanian rule. It was annexed by Jordan in 1950.

In 1961, the population was 337.

Post-1967
Since the Six-Day War in 1967, Nabi Salih has been under Israeli occupation.

The population decreased substantially after the Six-Day War, due to residents fleeing the site towards other Palestinian localities or Jordan. In 1982, the population reached 179.

Shrine of Salih
Local tradition identifies the blue-color-domed building complex in the village with the shrine of the prophet Salih (Biblical Shelah). The modern structure was built in the 19th century during Ottoman rule. The building included a zawiya, a Sufi lodging space and was guarded by a watchman. It was situated on the remains of a Crusader structure, which was presumably built atop the ruins of a Byzantine-era church. The remains of the Crusader-Byzantine structure, include apses of a three-aisle chapel located behind the shrine complex.

The Maqam (shrine) Nabi Salih was the most important religious structure, out of 16 different edifices, in the Bani Zeid region. It served as a gathering place for families during two rites of passage for their young sons: collective circumcisions and first hair cuts. These events were followed by celebratory picnics and games. Coinciding with Easter Week celebrated by the local Christians, Muslims from the area would visit the Nabi Salih shrine and from there would depart for the annual procession to the al-Aqsa Mosque compound and the Nabi Musa ("Prophet Moses") shrine south of Jericho. The inhabitants of the al-Salihiyah neighborhood of Damascus, who claimed descent from the Abbasids, regarded Nabi Salih as the site of their eponym and would travel there to commemorate the site. It was at Nabi Salih that hundreds of men from Deir Ghassaneh and other villages of the Bani Zeid sheikhdom would interact with the wider Arabic-speaking Muslim community from Palestine and the Levant.

In 2003, under the supervision of architect Yara al-Sharif , the complex was restored. It cost $63,000, primarily funded by Sweden. The prayer hall and tomb room are owned by the Islamic waqf authority, but is rented by the Nabi Salih Cultural Centre. Currently, the complex is composed of three floors (including an underground floor) containing the tomb, a large prayer room, an olive press, a water well, a classroom, a multipurpose hall, a double-vaulted lecture room, a courtyard and two front and back terraces. All entrances are semi-circular pointed arches. The An Nabi Salih Cultural Centre serves as the most significant structure in the village.

Weekly protests
Nabi Salih's residents have hosted weekly demonstrations since 2009 protesting what they describe as confiscation of the village's lands and the takeover of their spring by the nearby Israeli settlement, Halamish. According to an IDF officer who had served in the area, the protests started in 2009 over a plot of citrus trees, and beehives, which was set alight by settlers in a price tag attack. IDF soldiers also used to bathe in 3 pools. Settlers put up a sign naming it "Meir's Spring", after Meir Segal, one of the founders of Halamish, weeded the area, put up benches, a pergola and picnic tables, and planted it out with pomegranates, figs and olives. In response to complaints, a staff officer in 2012  ordered the demolition of what the settlers had built. The order has not been carried out. The demonstrations also protest against the expansion of  the Halamish settlement over what they claim is private Palestinian land.

During the protests, there are regular clashes with the Israeli Army who attempt to disperse crowds by using live ammunition, teargas, skunk water, rubber bullets, sound grenades, and other dispersal methods while Palestinian youth respond by hurling stones. The Israeli authorities have attempted to suppress the demonstrations the residents using tactics such as night incursions targeting homes and arrests of alleged stone throwers, including children. On December 11, 2011, Mustafa Tamimi was shot in the face by a teargas canister at close range and later died from his injury, becoming the first resident of Nabi Salih to be killed during  a demonstration. The following day, a large group of protesters marched to the entrance of Halamish to commemorate Tamimi, but were stopped by the Israeli Army which arrested 15 demonstrators including Palestinians, Israelis and internationals.  Israel later closed the investigation without any repercussion against the soldier who had fired the shots.

Bassem al-Tamimi, one of the leaders of the protests, has been arrested twelve times by Israeli forces, at one point spending more than three years in administrative detention without trial. His most recent arrest took place in March 2011, when he was charged with sending youths to throw stones, holding a march without a permit, incitement, and perverting the course of justice; an Israeli military court found him guilty of the former two charges and not guilty of the latter. His arrest drew international attention, with the European Union describing him as a "human rights defender", and Amnesty International designating him a prisoner of conscience.

Other security incidents
 On 19 November 2012 Rushdi Tamimi, a 28-year-old Palestinian protester, was killed by Israeli fire during a demonstration in Nabi Salih in solidarity with the people of the Gaza Strip in light of Israeli Operation Pillar of Cloud offensive.
 On 16 January 2016 the Israeli army sealed the main road entering the village.
 On 16 July 2017, a 34-year old suspect, believed to have been the gunman who targeted a vehicle near an Israeli settlement north of Ramallah and wounded a foreign national of Palestinian descent, was killed by Israeli soldiers after he attempted to fire upon them.

Nabi Salih was one of three main subjects of the 2016 book "The Way to the Spring: Life and Death in Palestine" by Ben Ehrenreich.

B'Tselem reports

In February 2011, B'Tselem volunteers filmed Israeli soldiers coming to the homes of Palestinian residents, waking and photographing children. A B'Tselem report released in September 2011 accused Israel’s security forces of infringing the rights of the Palestinian demonstrators in Nabi Saleh.

On 31 August 2012 two demonstrators at the village were injured by bullets during a protest gathering.  The IDF undertook to investigate and said that soldiers fired shots into the air in response to stone-throwing.

In 2016, the villagers decided to stop their protest marches. In the six years since 2010, the mayor estimated that 350 members out of a population of 600 had suffered injuries from various Israeli crowd dispersal measures, 50 of whom had been disabled.

On 6 June 2018, Israeli shot dead Izz Abd al-Hafith Tamimi (21), according to local sources at point-blank range, with three live bullets to the neck. Palestinian sources reported that he was being sought on suspicion of being a stone-thrower. The incident occurred during clashes  that arose during an Israeli raid on the village. One Israeli army reports say he was shot by a soldier who had been wounded by a rock thrown by the youth, but according to the Twitter account of the Israeli army no Israeli soldier was injured.

Geography

The village is located in the Raya Valley, at an elevation of 570 meters above sea level along the mountainous chain running down the West Bank. Nabi Salih is located 20 kilometers northwest the cities of Ramallah and al-Bireh. It is adjacent of the Beit Rima part of Bani Zeid in the northwest. Other nearby localities include Kafr Ein in the north, Deir as-Sudan to the northeast, 'Abud to the west, and Deir Nidham to the southwest.

In a 1945 land and population survey by Sami Hadawi, Nabi Salih had a total land area of 2,846 dunams, of which 2,797 was Arab-owned, the remainder public-owned. The built-up area of the village only constituted 11 dunams, while 735 dunams were planted with olive groves.

Important Bird Area
A largely forested 3,500 ha site in the vicinity of the villages of Nabi Salih and Umm Safa has been recognised as an Important Bird Area (IBA) by BirdLife International because it supports a population of lesser spotted eagles.

Hydrology
There is a series of five natural springs in the Raya Valley that extends between Nabi Salih and the nearby village of Dir Nizam. Ein al Qaws is the largest of four natural springs in the Raya valley. The others are Ein Al Raya on the northwest of Highway 465, Ein al Qaws and Ein Khaled, side by side to the southeast of Highway 465 and Ein El Zama'a on Highway 50.

Ein al-Qaws Spring
Near the village there is a natural spring named Ein al-Qaws ("the Bow Spring") which is owned by an individual of the village, Bashir Tamimi. In 2009 settlers from the nearby illegal Israeli settlement of Halamish took control over the spring and its surroundings and  prevented Palestinian access to their land. Subsequently, people of Nabi Salih and the nearby village of Dir Nizam began regular Friday protests for the spring, and against the Israeli occupation in general.

Demographics
In the 1997 census by the Palestinian Central Bureau of Statistics (PCBS), Nabi Salih had a population of 371. Palestinian refugees constituted just 4.3% of the inhabitants. According to the PCBS, the village had a population of 524 inhabitants in mid-year 2006. The 2007 PCBS census recorded a population of 534.

Notable residents
 Ahlam Tamimi, accomplice in the Sbarro restaurant suicide bombing
 Bassem Tamimi, activist for the Palestinian cause
 Ahed Tamimi, teen activist for the Palestinian cause, arrested in December 2017 for slapping an Israeli soldier

See also

Nabi Samwil

References

Bibliography

External links
Welcome To al-Nabi Salih
Nabi Salih, Welcome to Palestine
Survey of Western Palestine, Map 14:    IAA, Wikimedia commons 
 Nabi Salih Factsheet, Applied Research Institute–Jerusalem, ARIJ
 Nabi Salih   profile, ARIJ
Nabi Salih  aerial photo, ARIJ
Mighty Israel and its quest to quash Palestinian popular protest The military has delegated its best soldiers, investigators and judges to safeguarding Israel against the organizer of Nabi Saleh's popular uprising, by Amira Hass, 28.03.11, Haaretz
Brian Wood. Nabi Saleh village, Palestine 
Nabi Saleh , from the Popular Struggle Coordination Committee
An Nabi Saleh, from ISM
Holy Land , documentary film
Stone Cold Justice, by John Lyons,  for Australian Broadcasting Corporation

Shrines in the State of Palestine
Villages in the West Bank
Important Bird Areas of the State of Palestine